Mullingar Arts Centre is a performing arts centre in Mullingar, County Westmeath, Ireland.

History 

The site was previously occupied by the old county gaol which was built in the late 18th century. The current building was commissioned as the headquarters of Westmeath County Council and was completed in 1913. It was opened by Douglas Hyde, the future first President of Ireland and known as "County Hall". It became a performing arts centre in 1998 and subsequently benefited from concerts by local celebrities such as Joe Dolan.

References 

Buildings and structures in Mullingar